"Stars Above Us" is a single from the band Saint Etienne. Taken from the album Tales from Turnpike House, It was released in the US only by record label Savoy Jazz. The single was released under the mis-leading title Dance Remixes Volume 1.

The remixes for the single were done by Eric Kupper and Jeff Barringer. The single also featured the album version, produced by the Xenomania production team, who also co-wrote the track with the band.

Track listing 

Saint Etienne (band) songs
2006 singles
Song recordings produced by Xenomania
Songs written by Bob Stanley (musician)
Songs written by Pete Wiggs
Songs written by Sarah Cracknell
2006 songs
Songs written by Shawn Lee (musician)
Songs written by Tim Powell (producer)